Koobor is an exinct genus of extinct phascolarctid marsupials. The genus contains two species: Koobor jimbarratti and Koobor notabillis.

References

External links 
 

Koalas
Prehistoric vombatiforms
Fossil taxa described in 1976
Prehistoric mammals of Australia
Prehistoric marsupial genera